Baike may refer to:
 Baidu Baike, Chinese collaborative web-based encyclopedia
 Baike.com, Chinese social network
 Soso Baike, Chinese collaborative web-based encyclopedia